The ASALT 96 (also called PM md. 96) is a 9mm submachine gun of Romanian origin. The weapon is based on the Uzi but with the magazine insert in front of the trigger group.

References

9mm Parabellum submachine guns
Submachine guns of Romania